Orwell Township is one of the twenty-seven townships of Ashtabula County, Ohio, United States. The 2010 census found 3,106 people in the township, 1,446 of whom lived in the unincorporated portions of the township.

Geography
Located on the southwestern edge of the county, it borders the following townships:
Rome Township - north
New Lyme Township - northeast corner
Colebrook Township - east
Greene Township, Trumbull County - southeast corner
Bloomfield Township, Trumbull County - south
Mesopotamia Township, Trumbull County - southwest corner
Windsor Township - west
Hartsgrove Township - northwest corner

The village of Orwell is located in central Orwell Township.

Name and history
It is the only Orwell Township statewide.

The first settler in Orwell Township was former New York resident A.H. Paine, who arrived in 1815. The township was named Leffingwell Township until 1826.

Government
The township is governed by a three-member board of trustees, who are elected in November of odd-numbered years to a four-year term beginning on the following January 1. Two are elected in the year after the presidential election and one is elected in the year before it. There is also an elected township fiscal officer, who serves a four-year term beginning on April 1 of the year after the election, which is held in November of the year before the presidential election. Vacancies in the fiscal officership or on the board of trustees are filled by the remaining trustees.

References

External links
County website

Townships in Ashtabula County, Ohio
Townships in Ohio